Red Mercury is a 2005 British film thriller directed by Roy Battersby and starring Stockard Channing, Pete Postlethwaite, Juliet Stevenson, Ron Silver and David Bradley.

Plot
The film is a thriller about a terrorist kidnapping.
Three Islamist terrorist bomb-makers have just obtained some red mercury, a semi-mythical explosive. They get a tipoff that their safehouse is about to be raided and they flee on foot from the police. In an attempt to escape they kidnap hostages in a Greek restaurant in London and threaten to detonate a bomb containing the titular explosive. Eventually they are defeated and the hostages are saved and the film ends.

Cast
David Bradley as Neil Ashton
Stockard Channing as Penelope
Pete Postlethwaite as Gold Commander
Ron Silver as Sidney
Juliet Stevenson as Sofia Warburton
Nigel Terry as Lindsey
Alex Caan as Mushtaq
Navin Chowdhry as Asif
Nicholas Farrell as Minister
Amanda Ryan as Electra
Honeysuckle Weeks as Clarissa
Jason Hughes as Jeff Collins

Production

The film was written, produced and filmed over a four-month period.

The film was the first film aimed for a Western audience produced by a new film production company named Inspire, that planned to apply Bollywood film production methods to films made in the United Kingdom:

According to the producers the writer, Farrukh Dhondy, was interviewed by British counter-terrorism officials, to verify that the bomb-plot in the script was unrelated to their active investigations.

Release
The film was sold at the 2005 Cannes Film Market. It was released in the UK shortly after the 7 July 2005 London bombings, rendering its theme of Islamic terrorism particularly topical. It was screened at the Cleveland International Film Festival in 2006. It did not have a theatrical release in the USA, being released to DVD in June 2007.

Reception
Variety compared it to Dog Day Afternoon and Juggernaut, as a socially-committed thriller with more talk than action. Their critic praised the technical values and performances, but found some of the plotting to be "sloppy" and "forced" with some characters "underwritten". Jack G Shaheen criticised it for the "one-dimensional" portrayal of the villains.

References

External links 
 

2005 films
British thriller films
MI5 in fiction
Films scored by Colin Towns
2000s English-language films
2000s British films